Even is a Norwegian given name coming from Old Norse Eivindr (existing as Eivindur in Iceland). Another common name derived from Old Norse Eivindr is the Norwegianized Eivind. Eivind, and variants such as Øyvind.

It can be theorized that the name has its origin in the Proto-Norse roots (*auja-, *-winduR) held to mean 'gift' and 'winner', respectively.

Notable people with the name include:

Even Benestad, documentary film director
Even Erlien, politician
Even Hansen, civil servant and politician
Even Johansen, musician
Even Lange, economic historian
Even Pellerud, football player and coach
Even Stormoen, actor
Even Wetten, speed skater

Characters
Even Bech Næsheim, a recurring character in the Norwegian TV show Skam

See also

Odd (name)

References

Norwegian masculine given names